Stephen Bradley is an Irish director, scriptwriter, producer.

Filmography

Director
 Sweety Barrett (1998)
 Boy Eats Girl (2005)
 Noble (2015)

Writer
 Sweety Barrett (1998)
 Noble (2014)

Producer
 My Left Foot (1989) (assistant to line producer)
 Guiltrip (1995) (executive producer)

Bibliography

References

External links

Irish film directors
Irish film producers
Living people
Year of birth missing (living people)